Stanhope is a Canadian village and community of Coaticook, Coaticook RCM, in the  Estrie region of Quebec. Its population is less than 200 residents.

History
The village was a separate community in the 1890s which later became part of Coaticook municipality.

Geography

Located on the Canada–United States border, in front of the town of Norton (Essex County, Vermont); Stanhope spans its residential area on a main road west of the Coaticook River, nearby the Montreal-Sherbrooke-Portland rail. To the east is located the now defunct Stanhope Airport and, on the Quebec Route 147, the border control station.

The village is 6 km far from Dixville, 14 from Coaticook, 24 from Canaan (Vermont), 27 from Stewartstown (New Hampshire), 30 from Brighton (Vermont) and 50 from Sherbrooke.

Transport
The village had a small private airport, is crossed by the Quebec Route 147 and by the St. Lawrence and Atlantic Railroad.

See also
List of Canada–United States border crossings

References

External links

Communities in Estrie
Canada–United States border